The JC Williamson Award (formally known as the James Cassius Williamson Award), is an lifetime achievement award presented annually as a sector of the Helpmann Awards, governed by Live Performance Australia.
 
The awards are named after the American actor, who became Australia's foremost pioneering leading theatre entrepreneur James Cassius Williamson 
 
The board of directors of the JC William Awards committee elects recipients who are members of the performing arts, art administrators, entrepreneurs, members of the media, playwrights, theatre producers, directors and politicians 
  
In 2020 and 2021, the awards where cancelled due to COVID-19, but it was announced in May 2021, that recipients will be awarded for the 2020 season.

Recognition incitement
The awards are a lifetime achievement award in recognition with the incitement of "individuals who have made an outstanding contribution to the Australian live entertainment and performing arts industry and shaped the future of our industry for the better", the award is the highest honour the LPA can bestow.

Recipients

References

External links
 The official Helpmann Awards website

Helpmann Awards
Lifetime achievement awards
Awards established in 1998